Charlotte Charke/Charles Browne (née Cibber, also Charlotte Secheverell, aka Charles Brown) was an English actress, playwright, novelist, and autobiographer. Today she would potentially be identified as nonbinary or transgender. She acted on the stage from the age of seventeen in breeches roles, and took to wearing male clothing off the stage as well. 

She assumed the name "Charles Brown" and called her daughter "Mrs. Brown." She suffered a series of failures in her business affairs after working in various jobs commonly associated with men which includes valet, sausage maker, farmer, pastry chef and tavern owner. She eventually succeeded under her name as a writer and continued as a novelist and memoirist until her death in 1760.

Early life

Charke was the twelfth and last child born to actor/playwright and poet laureate Colley Cibber and the musician/actress Katherine Shore. She was born when her mother was forty-five and felt she had been "an unwelcome Guest to the family." Most of her siblings had died before their first birthday. Her siblings resented her when she was young, and many disliked her throughout their lives.

Like her brothers and sisters, she had an interest in the theatre. She spent time at the Theatre Royal of Drury Lane, where her father was manager.

Family members and friends say Charlotte began to show her "addiction" to manly activities at a young age. Since her father was often absent due to business endeavors and her mother had constant illnesses, Charlotte became independent at a young age but was occasionally looked after by maids.

Between 1719 and 1721, she was educated at Mrs. Draper's School for girls in Park Street, Westminster, where she studied the liberal arts, Latin, Italian, and geography. Following this, she moved to live with her mother in Middlesex and continued her studies at home – including dance under the "celebrated Mr. Grosconet". She described her education as a "genteel one", and she never took an interest in embroidery or table dressing, instead preferring to learn about science and language. She suggested that her identification with the male gender began early in her life, as she recalled impersonating her father as a small child. When she moved in with her mother, she taught herself traditionally male activities such as shooting, gardening, and horse racing. In 1724, she and her mother moved to Hertfordshire, and there she continued engaging in country sports and education, focusing on subjects and pursuits usually associated with males. According to her anecdotes, she also studied medicine there and, in 1726, tried to set herself up as a doctor at the age of 13. This only lasted a few years, as she moved back home with her father when she was sixteen.

Actress
In 1729, when she was sixteen, she was courted by composer and violinist Richard Charke, and the two were married on 4 February 1730, only six months after. The marriage was short-lived since she believed Mr. Charke only wanted to reap the rewards of being "Mr. Colley Cibber's son-in-law" due to his disastrous financial status. Once married, Charlotte, no longer in the care of her parents, began to appear on stage.

In her memoirs, she speaks of her admiration for the "perfect" Mrs. Anne Oldfield, who encouraged her "hopes of success". She made her debut when she was seventeen, on 8 April 1730, in the stereotypically ultra-feminine minor role of Mademoiselle in The Provok'd Wife, by John Vanbrugh, at Drury Lane. However, she stopped performing after discovering she was pregnant. Her daughter, Catherine (also known as Kitty), was born in December 1730. By June 1731, Charlotte was back on stage as Lucy in The London Merchant by George Lillo. In July of that year, she made her first appearance in a breeches role as Tragedo in the same play and followed that the next year with Roderigo in Othello. Charlotte also became fascinated at playing travesty roles, male roles played by women. She would later appear as Mrs. Slammerkin in The Beggar's Opera and the tomboyish Hoyden in The Relapse. Around this time, Charke began wearing male clothing off the stage, although intermittently.

In 1733, Colley Cibber sold his controlling interest in the Drury Lane Theatre to John Highmore, and Charlotte felt that it should have gone instead to herself and her brother, Theophilus Cibber. It is likely that the sale was at a vastly inflated price and that Colley's goal was to get out of debt and make himself a profit (see Robert Lowe in his edition of Cibber's Apology). Theophilus, who likely knew of the scheme, grew bolder in demands when his father was not liable for payment and organized an actors' revolt. Charles Fleetwood then came to control the theatre, and after several more loyal years of belonging to the Drury Lane Company, Charlotte found herself jobless and alone. She was fired from the company for constantly quarreling with Charles Fleetwood, the current manager, and for boisterous behavior, which people described as "private Misconduct". Despite her father's request to reinstate her position, Charlotte decided to leave Drury Lane and move on to different endeavors. Charlotte was denied entry to many theatres once she left Drury Lane, making it difficult for her to find work, so she picked a smaller venue where she wrote and performed a story called The Art of Management (Fields Part II). She created her own company in the summer of 1735 in Lincoln's Inn Fields. She wrote her first play, The Art of Management, in September 1735. It was a direct attack on Fleetwood, who attempted to buy up all printed copies of the play to prevent it circulating.

She took the significant step of joining Henry Fielding in the Haymarket in 1736. For him, she appeared as Lord Place, a parody of her father, Colley Cibber, in Fielding's Pasquin of 1736. The play was a powerful attack on Robert Walpole and his government. Colley Cibber was satirized for his attachment to Walpole and his undeserving occupation of the place of poet laureate. Walpole led Parliament into passing the Licensing Act of 1737, which closed all non-patent theatres and forbade the acting of any play that had not passed official censors. Charlotte Charke's famously antagonistic relationship with both of London's government-recognized patent theatres meant that she would have great difficulty finding legitimate employment as an actress. For his part, her husband Richard, who had remained at Drury Lane, had already become estranged from Charlotte through his constant and costly affairs. He fled his heavy-gambling debts by moving to Jamaica, where he soon died. Charlotte suddenly found herself with neither occupation nor husband, alienated from her powerful father, and herself a single mother, at the age of twenty-four. By this point, Charlotte Charke wore male clothes frequently, even off-stage.

Mr. Brown and poverty 
In 1738, she was granted the uncommon privilege of a license to run Punch's Theatre at St. James's. This was a puppet theatre, and she used her wooden cast to perform several satirical plays. Many stringed figures were caricatured after current politicians and actors, including her father, Colley. Her puppet shows were popular, nor could the government shut them down since no human actors appeared on stage. She decided to take her theatre on a national tour but fell seriously ill. According to her autobiography, medical bills cost her the theatre, and she was obliged to sell her puppets at a severe loss. She sent young Catherine off with begging notes to her friends and relatives, but no one in her family was willing or able to help her monetarily. Her father, in particular, was furious with her for the actors' rebellion at Drury Lane and her unflattering impression of him in Pasquin under his old enemy Fielding.

According to the autobiography, the principal aid she received at this stage was from other actors. While trying to raise money from friends, she was arrested for debt and imprisoned. According to her Autobiography, the coffee-house keepers and prostitutes of Covent Garden banded together to raise the money for her bail.

At this point, she appeared in public almost exclusively as a male. This became distinct when Charke joined Jockey Adams' touring company outside of London in 1741 and assumed the billing "Mr. Charles Brown". Within The Narrative, Charke recalls this male persona going as far as to be the "improper object"(57) of love, from an orphan heiress, speculated to be Mary Harlowe. Charke speaks in her memoir of being invited to tea by this suitor, who was "absolutely struck speechless for some little Time" when Charke revealed her gender, with Charke expressing to her that she "sincerely grieved it was not in my Power" to reciprocate(58). Unable to earn a living in the sanctioned theatres, Charlotte began to work any job she could to support herself and Catherine, but she was always attracted to jobs she could perform as a man. Therefore, she was a valet to Richard Annesley, 6th Earl of Anglesey, and even became a sausage maker. Anglesey was famous as a bigamist and libertine and lived with a paramour during Charlotte's employ. Charlotte claimed that when Anglesey was not entertaining guests, the trio would dine together as friendly equals. As a valet's service would indeed be personal, usually including dressing one's master for the day, the entire arrangement would have been quite unusual. (Anglesey was soon a significant party to an infamous scandal, being dispossessed of his lands—but allowed to continue using his title—after a court ruled that he had sold his young kinsman, James Annesley, who had a better claim to the inheritance, into slavery.)

In 1742, Charlotte acquired a new acting company in the New Theatre in St. James's and produced her second play, Tit for Tat, or, Comedy and Tragedy at War. In the flush of early success, she borrowed money from her uncle and opened the Charlotte Charke Tavern in Drury Lane. This failed due to her customers' thieving and her generosity, resulting in her selling it at a loss. In the summer season, she appeared in a series of male roles. At this point, she was "Charles Brown" in public in London on an everyday basis. She joined Theophilus Cibber at the Haymarket in 1744 and then joined William Hallam's company. She married John Sacheverell in 1746, but scholars cannot determine anything about this man, and Charke refers to him, unnamed, only in passing in her autobiography. Her marriage was cut short by Sacheverell's death.

At a typical moment of penury, Charlotte was offered the leading male role of Punch (of Punch & Judy fame) in a new puppet theatre proposed by Mr. Russell due to her recognized abilities as both a comic performer and a proven manipulator of complex stringed marionettes. The short season was an artistic and financial success for Charlotte. Before it could be repeated, however, the theatre's founder was arrested for debts and confined to Newgate Prison, where he died after losing his fortune and mind. Charlotte attempted to buy her friend's puppets from Russell's landlord, who had claimed them, but she could not meet his asking price, and the little company likewise passed out of existence. An unproduced script Russell had written was also kept by the dead man's creditors as collateral, thus preventing Charlotte from staging it as she had promised its author. The script was lost as well.

Sometime in 1747, Charke went on the road as a strolling player, travelling the West Country with her daughter. In 1750, Catherine Charke married an actor named John Harman, despite Charlotte's aversion to him. During these peripatetic years, Charlotte was once imprisoned (with males) as a vagabond actor, worked as a (male) pastry chef, and set herself up as a farmer. Earlier she had run a grocery store. All her attempts at business ended alike in failure. Between 1752 and 1753, she wrote for the Bristol Weekly Intelligencer, and in 1754 she worked as a prompter in Bath, under her name but in men's clothing. She found many of the players difficult and untalented compared to those she had known in her privileged youth. At the end of the year, she decided to move back to London and make her living as a writer.

Writer
The final chapter of Charlotte's life was defined by her writing. She looked for ways to improve her relationship with her father, and writing was her only option. In 1754, Charke wrote her first novel, The History of Mr. Henry Dumont, Esq; and Miss Charlotte Evelyn and sold it for only ten guineas. It was published in 1755, and the publisher's estimate of its value was apparently confirmed, as it did not sell especially well. However, Charke, like her father, was still famous and infamous, and she began writing her autobiography, A Narrative of the Life of Mrs. Charlotte Charke (1755), which began to appear in installments. These sold very well, and the installments were collected and sold as a book, which went into two editions in the year. An abridged form appeared in the Gentleman's Magazine. This was one of the first autobiographies ever written by a woman.

Charke's tone is described as like her father's; chatty, witty, relaxed, and intimate. It is a mixture of honesty and self-flattery, but with nothing like her father's self-aggrandizement. She wrote the autobiography, she said, to reconcile herself with her father. It did not work. He would not communicate with her, returning a letter unopened, and when he died on 12 December 1757, a very wealthy man, he left Charlotte a token £5. In response, Charke wrote The Lover's Treat, or, Unnatural Hatred, a novel about families at war with themselves. She also published the short stories The Mercer, and The History of Charley and Patty sometime between the years of 1757 and 1759.

In 1758, Catherine and her husband moved to America, and in 1759 Charke attempted to return to the stage in the breeches role of Marplot in Susanna Centlivre's The Busybody. With her father dead, her family members gone, and her daughter Kitty abroad in New York, Charlotte, again, was alone. In mid-April 1760, at the age of forty-seven, Charlotte fell ill with a "winter disease" and was never able to recover from it. She died that year at her lodgings in Haymarket, London, with only the remembrance of being "the celebrated Mrs. Charlotte Charke, Daughter of the late Colley Cibber, Esq., Poet Laureat; a Gentlewoman remarkable for her Adventures and Misfortunes."

Reception history
Charlotte Charke's reception tends to be skewed based on the audience of her works. Her family, other literary authors during the eighteenth century, the mass media of the eighteenth century, and literary scholars of the modern era all perceive Charke in different ways.

Charke's father, Colly Cibber, and her family as a whole favored the innocent Charlotte persona. Her early works as an actress found her respect amongst her family, which lead to her marrying Richard Charke of the same theatre company she acted in. However, with her husband cheating on her after only a few months, her innocent lifestyle turns risqué as she tries to acquire acting jobs for compensation to support herself and her child. These roles included her work in men's clothing, which resulted in her father, and her family as a whole, cutting Charlotte out of the family and disowning her. Her father never approved of her works from that time until his death. Perhaps it was her endeavouring to take over her father's legacy as a writer, or the social norm barring cross-dressing, but her father never deemed her works acceptable and never read them.

In her time, Charke successfully performed as a female in male roles. These plays had popularity, as Henry Fielding specifically produced plays of women in disguise, and Charlotte Charke was the lead actor for these parts. "By the time Fielding cast her, in 1736-37, in male parts in his own plays Pasquin, Eurydice Hiss'd, and The Historical Register, she had already made a name for herself." This success allowed Charke to support herself and her child. To men like Fielding, Charke's ability to play male roles brought her notoriety, unlike most women who were known for their writing, or acting in women's roles in plays.

Even with this theatrical success, Charke still struggled financially. She tried to find success in jobs while dressed as a man, but nothing really was working for her. At this time, she turned to writing to accumulate wealth. As an inspired author, her new goal was to find a publisher and bookseller. Her first encounter with a bookseller and a fellow writer perfectly describes the peculiar behavior of Charke. "[Charke was] sitting under the mantle-piece, by a fire … On one hob sat a monkey, … at our author’s feet, on the flounce of her dingy petticoat, reclined a dog … A magpie perched on the top round of her chair … and on her lap was placed a mutilated pair of bellows; the pipe was gone … Her ink-stand was a broken tea-cup, the pen worn to a stump … The work was read, remarks made, and alterations agreed to."

As for her written works, her autobiography A Narrative of the Life of Mrs. Charlotte Charke was by far her most critically acclaimed literary work. This work saw great reviews and recommendations as well as harsh reviews filled with criticism. Some authors found her work compelling and justified, while the majority found it scandalous. When it was first published, people would take it as a "humorous odyssey" and would read it for pure entertainment. Her life, as written in her autobiography, was seen more as a joke or a story than something that should be read for educational value. Scholars of both the eighteenth and nineteenth century saw Charke's work as a desperate attempt for economic gain. Later criticism of Charke's autobiography appeared in John Fyvie's novel Comedy Queens of the Georgian Era which recalls the reception of Charke during her life, with the reality of her life juxtaposed to create a complicated persona to Charke. "The eccentricity of her character, and the lively narration of her singular adventures, cannot fail to raise many a laugh; while the spectacle of a young lady of respectable birth, brought up in affluence, well-educated according to the notions of her day, and possessed of considerable natural talent, who was, to use her own words, such an 'unfortunate devil' that the greater part of her life was spent in squalor and misery, may, at any rate, 'claim the passing tribute of a sigh.'" On the outside, Charke was seen as a comedic writer, full of happiness, when in reality, she struggled financially, and emotionally, and was forced to write for her living.

The Oxford Dictionary of National Biography states "her self-representation had already contributed significantly to the development of psychological introspection in the emerging genre of the novel." Her autobiography is known as one of the first female autobiographies written, and one of the first accounts of what it is like to be born a woman who dresses and acts like a man. Her autobiography A Narrative of the Life of Mrs. Charlotte Charke provides a potential firsthand account into what it is like to be non-binary or possibly transgender in the eighteenth century.

Notable roles 

 Mademoiselle in 'The Provok'd Wife]] by John Vanbrugh in April 1730 at Drury Lane. Also November 1732 at Drury Lane. Also April 1735 at Drury Lane.
 Aurora in Cephalus and Procris' in February 1731 at Drury Lane. Also in May 1732 at Drury Lane. Also May 1734 at Drury Lane.
 Lucy in The London Merchant' by George Lilo in July 1731 at Drury Lane. Also in October 1731, August 1732 at Drury Lane. Also August 1732 at Drury Lane. Also October 1732 at Drury Lane. Also in December 1733 at Theatre Royal Haymarket. Also December 1735 at Drury Lane.
 Thalia in 'The Triumphs of Love and Honour in August 1731 at Drury Lane.
 Trusty in 'The Provoked Husband by Colley Cibber in November 1731 at Drury Lane.
 Mrs Raisin in 'Greenwich Park' in December 1731 at Drury Lane. Also in October 1732 at Drury Lane.
 Lately in The Modern Husband by Henry Fielding in February 1732 at Drury Lane.
 Cloris in 'The Rehearsal' by George Villers in April 1732 at Drury Lane.
 Clarinda in The Double Gallant in May 1732 at Drury Lane. Also in October 1732 at Drury Lane. Also October 1733 at Theatre Royal Haymarket.
 Andromache in The Distrest Mother' by Ambrose Philips in June 1732 at Drury Lane.
 Tragedo in [[The London Merchant|'The London Merchant in by George Lilo July 1732 at Drury Lane.
 Roderigo in 'Othello' by William Shakespeare in August 1732 at Drury Lane. Also May 1734 at Drury Lane.
 Mrs Slammekin in The Beggar's Opera by John Gay in August 1732 at Drury Lane. Also December 1732 at Drury Lane.
 Lucy in '''The History of King Henry and the Villith and Anne Bullen in September 1732 at Bartholomew Fair.
 Mrs Lupine in 'Caelia' or 'The Perjur'd Lover by Charles Johnson in December 1732 at Drury Lane.
 Fainlove in 'The Tender Husband by Richard Steele in January 1733 at Drury Lane. Also November 1734 at Drury Lane.
 Molly in 'The Boarding School by Charles Coffey in January 1733 at Drury Lane.
 Procris in Cephalus and Procris in January 1733 at Drury Lane.
 Hoyden in 'The Relapse' by John Vanbrugh in March 1733 at Drury Lane. Also October 1734 at Drury Lane.
 Alicia om 'Jane Shore by Nicholas Rowe in April 1733 at Drury Lane.
 Haly in 'Tamerlane The Great Nicholas Rowe in August 1733 at Bartholomew Fair.
 Louisa in Love Makes a Man by Colley Cibber in October 1733 at Drury Lane. Also November 1734 at Drury Lane. Also in November 1735 at Drury Lane.
 Sylvia in The Recruiting Officer by George Farquhar in November 1733 at Theatre Royal Haymarket.
 Lady Pride in 'The Amarous Widow' or 'The Wanton Wife by Thomas Betterton in November 1733 at Theatre Royal Haymarket.
 Charlotte in 'Oroonoko'  in November 1733 at Theatre Royal Haymarket. Also in October 1734 at Drury Lane.
 Marcia in Cato' by Joseph Addison in November 1733 at Theatre Royal Haymarket.
 Abigail in 'The Scournful Lady by John Flecther in December 1733 at Theatre Royal Haymarket. Also February 1735 at Drury Lane.
 Lady Woudbe in 'Volpone' by Ben Jonson in December 1733 at Theatre Royal Haymarket.
 Mrs Otter in 'The Silent Woman by Ben Jonson in December 1733 at Theatre Royal Haymarket.
 Isabella in [[Wit Without Money|'Wit Without Money]] by John Fletcher in December 1733 at Theatre Royal Haymarket.
 Douglass in 'The Albion Queens by Barton Booth in January 1734 at Theatre Royal Haymarket. Also in April 1735 at Drury Lane.
 Talanthe in Chronnohotonthologos' by Henry Carey February 1734 at Theatre Royal Haymarket.
 Lucilla in 'The Fair Penitent' by Nicholas Rowe in March 1734 at Drury Lane.
 Primorse in 'The Mother-In-Law' in May 1734 at Drury Lane.
 Lord Flame in The Beggar's Opera by John Gay in May 1734 at Theatre Royal Haymarket.
 Macheath in [[The Beggar's Opera|'The Beggar's Opera]] by John Gay in June 1734 Theatre Royal Haymarket. Also in July 1736 Theatre Royal Haymarket. Also in August 1736 at Theatre Royal Haymarket.
 Sir John in 'The Humours of Sir John Falsatff' in June 1734 at Theatre Royal Haymarket. 
 Charlotte in 'Oroonoko in June 1734 at Theatre Royal Haymarket.
 George Barnwell in 'The London Merchant' by George Lilo in June 1734 at Theatre Royal Haymarket. Also July 1735 at the Theatre in Lincoln's Inn Field. Also April 1736 at Theatre Royal Haymarket.
 Lothario in The Fair Penitent' by Nicholas Rowe in June 1734 at Theatre Royal Haymarket.
 Heartly in 'The Nonjuror' by Colley Cibber in June 1734 at Theatre Royal Haymarket.
 Minerva in 'Penelope' or 'The Fair Disconsolate in July 1734 at Theatre Royal Haymarket.
 Harry in 'The Humorous Election  by a Miss Jones in July 1734 at Theatre Royal Haymarket.
 Polly in 'The Beggar's Opera'  by John Gay in August 1734 at Theatre Royal Haymarket. Also September 1735 at the Theatre in Lincoln's Inn Field.
 Sir Charles in '[[The Beaux' Stratagem|The Beaux Strategem]] by George Farquhar in August 1734 at Theatre Royal Haymarket.
 Townly in 'The Provok'd Husband' by Colley Cibber in August 1734 at Theatre Royal Haymarket
 Eboli in 'Don Carlos, Prince of Spain''' in August 1734 at Bartholomew Fair.
 Dol Common in [[The Alchemist (play)|'The Alchymist]] by Ben Jonson in September 1734 at Drury Lane.
 Lucy in '[[The Old Bachelor|The Old Batchelor]] by William Congrave in October 1743 at Drury Lane.
 Foppington in The Careless Husband by Colley Cibber in June 1735 at the Theatre in Lincoln's Inn Field.
 Milwood in 'The London Merchant by George Lilo in July 1735 at Drury Lane. Also in October 1735 at the Theatre in Lincoln's Inn Field.
 Sir Frances in 'The Provok'd Husband by Colley Cibber in August 1735 at the Theatre in Lincoln's Inn Field.
 Archer in 'Squire Basinghall by Edward Phillips in August 1735 at the Theatre in Lincoln's Inn Field.
 Gazetteer in 'Squire Basinghall by Edward Phillips in August 1735 at the Theatre in Lincoln's Inn Field.
 Grizzle in [[The Tragedy of Tragedies|'The Tragedy of Tragedies]] by Henry Fieldingin August 1735 at the Theatre in Lincoln's Inn Field.
 Pickle Herring in 'Bartholomew Fair' by Ben Jonson in August 1735 at the Theatre in Lincoln's Inn Field.
 Charles in 'Love Makes A Man' in August 1735 at the Theatre in Lincoln's Inn Field.
 French Harlequin in 'The Carnival' or 'Harlequin Blunderer by Charlotte Charke in August 1735 at the Theatre in Lincoln's Inn Field.
 Lord Place in 'Pasquin' by Henry Fielding in March 1736 at Theatre Royal Haymarket.
 Tim in 'The Female Rake by Dormer in April 1736 at Theatre Royal Haymarket.
 Clymene in 'Pasquin by Henry Fielding in April 1736 at Theatre Royal Haymarket.
 Agnes in 'Guilt Its Own Punishment''' by George Lilo in May 1736 at Theatre Royal Haymarket.
 Gaylove in The Honest Yorkshire Man' by Henry Fieldings in December 1736 at Theatre Royal Haymarket.

References

Further reading
"Charke, Charlotte." Encyclopedia of Women's Autobiography. Santa Barbara: ABC-CLIO, 2005. Credo Reference. Web. 15 March 2013.
Beynon, John C and Caroline Gonda, eds. Lesbian Dames: Sapphism in the Long Eighteenth Century. Burlington, VT: Ashgate, 2010.
Charke, Charlotte. A Narrative of the life of Mrs. Charlotte Charke. 1755. Ed. Robert Rehder. Brookfield, Vt.: Pickering & Chatto, 1999.
Charke, Charlotte. "The Art of Management; or, Tragedy . By Mrs. Charlotte Charke, 1713–1760." London: printed by W. Rayner, and sold at the pamphlet-shops, 1735. Eighteenth-Century Collections Online. Web. 15 March 2013
Cibber, Colley (first published 1740, ed. Robert Lowe, 1889). An Apology for the Life of Colley Cibber, vol.1, vol 2. London.
Melville, Lewis [pseud. for Lewis Saul Benjamin], Stage Favourites of the Eighteenth Century. London: Hutchinson, 1900. Internet Archive. Web. 15 March 2013.
Morgan, Fidelis, The Well Known Troublemaker – A life of Charlotte Charke. London: Faber, 1989.
Fyvie, John.  Comedy Queens of the Georgian Era. New York, E. P. Dutton 1907. Internet Archive. Web. 15 March 2013.
Shevelow, Kathryn, Charlotte: Being a True Account of an Actress's Flamboyant Adventures in Eighteenth-Century London's Wild and Wicked Theatrical World. Henry Holt, 2005.
Thompson, Lynda Mia.  "Charlotte Charke," in Matthew, H.C.G. and Brian Harrison, eds.  The Oxford Dictionary of National Biography.  vol. 11, 92–95.  London: OUP, 2004.Work Citings'''

Charke, Charlotte. A Narrative of the Life of Mrs. Charlotte Charke (youngest Daughter of Colley Cibbler, Esq.). Gainesville, FL: Scholars' Facsimiles & Reprints, 1969. Print.

Scechter, Joel. "A Lost Play Recovered." A Lost Play Recovered. Hunter-online Theatre Review, 2003. Web. 24 Feb. 2016.

Walton, Geri. "Charlotte Charke: Actress, Novelist, and Transvestite." Geri Walton. N.p., 11 Nov. 2015. Web. 24 Feb. 2016.

"Charlotte Charke and the Liminality of Bi-Genderings: A Study of Her Canonical Works" by Polly S. Fields from Pilgrimage for Love: Essays in Early Modern Literature in Honor of Josephine A. Roberts. Edited by Sigrid King. Medieval and Renaissance Texts and Studies Vol 213 (Tempe, AZ., 1999), pp. 221–48. Copyright Arizona Board of Regents for Arizona State University

External links
Polly S. Fields, "Charlotte Charke and the Liminality of Bi-Genderings: A Study of Her Canonical Works"
 

1713 births
1760 deaths
18th-century LGBT people
18th-century French women writers
18th-century French writers
18th-century English actresses
English stage actresses
18th-century English novelists
English women dramatists and playwrights
Drinking establishment owners
English dramatists and playwrights
English women novelists
British LGBT dramatists and playwrights
English LGBT novelists
Female-to-male cross-dressers
People imprisoned for debt